Guardado is a Spanish surname, which derives from guardar, meaning "to guard". It may refer to:

Albert Guardado (born 1973), American boxer
Andrés Guardado (born 1986), Mexican football player 
Eddie Guardado (born 1970), American baseball player
Emilio Guardado, Salvadoran football coach
Mark Guardado (1961–2008), American mobster
 Oscar Whalley Guardado

See also
Cuadrado

Spanish-language surnames
Portuguese-language surnames